Hilmar-Irwin is a census-designated place (CDP) in Merced County, California, United States. As of the 2020 census, the population was 5,164.

Geography

It is home to the Hilmar Cheese Company, a cheese manufacturer that offers public tours.

Climate
Hilmar-Irwin has hot, mostly dry summers and cool, wet winters.

Demographics

2010
At the 2010 census Hilmar-Irwin had a population of 5,197. The racial makeup of Hilmar-Irwin was 4,475 (86.1%) White, 15 (0.3%) African American, 23 (0.4%) Native American, 87 (1.7%) Asian, 1 (0.0%) Pacific Islander, 439 (8.4%) from other races, and 157 (3.0%) from two or more races. Hispanic or Latino of any race were 916 people (17.6%).

The whole population lived in households, no one lived in non-institutionalized group quarters and no one was institutionalized.

There were 1,755 households, 694 (39.5%) had children under the age of 18 living in them, 1,082 (61.7%) were opposite-sex married couples living together, 205 (11.7%) had a female householder with no husband present, 106 (6.0%) had a male householder with no wife present.  There were 82 (4.7%) unmarried opposite-sex partnerships, and 15 (0.9%) same-sex married couples or partnerships. 301 households (17.2%) were one person and 158 (9.0%) had someone living alone who was 65 or older. The average household size was 2.96.  There were 1,393 families (79.4% of households); the average family size was 3.32.

The age distribution was 1,390 people (26.7%) under the age of 18, 483 people (9.3%) aged 18 to 24, 1,289 people (24.8%) aged 25 to 44, 1,323 people (25.5%) aged 45 to 64, and 712 people (13.7%) who were 65 or older.  The median age was 36.2 years. For every 100 females, there were 96.9 males.  For every 100 females age 18 and over, there were 91.8 males.

There were 1,841 housing units at an average density of 468.7 per square mile, of the occupied units 1,288 (73.4%) were owner-occupied and 467 (26.6%) were rented. The homeowner vacancy rate was 0.9%; the rental vacancy rate was 6.8%.  3,672 people (70.7% of the population) lived in owner-occupied housing units and 1,525 people (29.3%) lived in rental housing units.

2000
As of the census of 2000, there were 4,807 people, 1,602 households, and 1,315 families in the CDP. The racial makeup of the CDP was 77.93% White, 0.35% Black or African American, 0.33% Native American, 2.39% Asian, 6.59% from other races, and 12.40% from two or more races. Hispanic or Latino of any race were 12.38% of the population.

Of the 1,602 households 42.0% had children under the age of 18 living with them, 67.9% were married couples living together, 9.5% had a female householder with no husband present, and 17.9% were non-families. 14.6% of households were one person and 8.9% were one person aged 65 or older.  The average household size was 3.00 and the average family size was 3.32.

The age distribution was 29.0% under the age of 18, 9.0% from 18 to 24, 29.5% from 25 to 44, 19.3% from 45 to 64, and 13.2% 65 or older.  The median age was 34 years. For every 100 females, there were 98.1 males.  For every 100 women age 18 and over, there were 93.7 men.

The median household income was $40,951 and the median family income  was $46,250. Males had a median income of $35,244 versus $23,551 for females. The per capita income for the CDP was $16,113.  About 4.3% of families and 6.4% of the population were below the poverty line, including 7.3% of those under age 18 and 4.1% of those age 65 or over.

1990
As of the census of 1990, there were 3,278 people. The racial makeup of the CDP was 92.2% White, .5% Black or African American, 1.7% Native American, 1.3% Asian, 5.3% from other races. Hispanic or Latino of any race were 11.1% of the population.

Politics
In the state legislature, Hilmar-Irwin is located in the 12th Senate District, represented by Republican Anthony Cannella, and in the 21st Assembly District, represented by Democrat Adam Gray.

2012 Citizen Redstricting:

Hilmar will now belong to CA State Assembly District 21. CA State Assembly District 17 is now a Bay Area assembly district.

See also
 Hilmar, California
 Irwin, California

References

Census-designated places in Merced County, California
Census-designated places in California

vo:Hilmar